Aphomia ochracea is a species of snout moth in the genus Aphomia. It was described by George Hampson in 1917 and is known from Papua New Guinea.

References

Moths described in 1917
Tirathabini
Moths of New Guinea